János Péter (28 October 1910 – 26 February 1999) was a Hungarian politician, who served as Minister of Foreign Affairs between 1961 and 1973. Prior to that, he was a Calvinist bishop.

Dean Rusk, the US Secretary of State reported that Péter had attempted to defraud the United States by pretending to be in contact with the government of North Vietnam. Rusk engaged in what he at the time believed to be serious negotiations to end the war in Vietnam. However, a defector named János Radványi later informed Rusk "that Péter was not in an effective contact with Hanoi, and that they had had no encouragement from Hanoi about the things that Péter was saying to me." Rusk came to believe that the Péter overture "was an instance that was just a plain fraud."

References

 Rulers.org

1910 births
1999 deaths
People from Tolna County
People from the Kingdom of Hungary
Hungarian Calvinist and Reformed clergy
Members of the Hungarian Socialist Workers' Party
Foreign ministers of Hungary
Members of the National Assembly of Hungary (1953–1958)
Members of the National Assembly of Hungary (1958–1963)
Members of the National Assembly of Hungary (1963–1967)
Members of the National Assembly of Hungary (1967–1971)
Members of the National Assembly of Hungary (1971–1975)
Members of the National Assembly of Hungary (1975–1980)
Members of the National Assembly of Hungary (1980–1985)
Members of the National Assembly of Hungary (1985–1990)